Ship to Shore is the first album by Nigel Mazlyn Jones, guitarist, singer and songwriter. The guitar style and sound, involving use of harmonics and extensive electronic treatments, is already fully formed. The album was recorded in March 1976 in Birmingham at Nest Studios, produced by Nigel Mazlyn Jones and engineered by Jake Commander and Kim Holmes. It features contributions by then-members of Decameron, Madrigal and Steve Ashley's band.

The album was reissued on CD in 2002 on Kissing Spell (KSCD 942), with additional tracks in the form of early recordings of songs intended for the LP but for which the vinyl LP format did not allow space.

Jones' Dudley roots are evinced by an LP sleeve credit to "Jack and Bob at Modern Music", the proprietors of a now defunct music shop in Castle Hill well known to all Midland musicians of the time.

Track listing
All tracks composed by Nigel Mazlyn Jones.
"A Singularly Fine Day" 5:20
"Take Me Home" 6:22
"The Man and the Deer" 5:36
"Follow Every Sunset" 3:45
"How High the Moon" 3:30
"Reality" 3:43
"Port Quin Song (The Lady On the Beach)" 3:41
"Ship to Shore" 12:10

Additional tracks on the CD reissue:

"All Brave Men"
"The Hunter and the Lady"
"Hunter's Tale"
"Ships' Tales"
"Neap Tide"
"High Tide"
"Frozen Waves"

Personnel
Nigel Mazlyn Jones - guitars, bass, waves, vocals
Dik Cadbury - basses, vocals
Johnny Coppin - guitar, vocals
Alleyn Menzies - drums
Jerry Riley - guitar
Rob Lloyd - guitar, mandolin
Martin Mitchell - violin

Additional personnel listed on CD reissue:

Dave Titley - acoustic 6 string guitar, pottery drum
Graham Horncy - bass
Alan Appleby - bass

Ship to Shore
1976 debut albums